Luis Armando Ruiz Carmona (born 3 August 1997) is a Venezuelan footballer who plays as a defender for Venezuelan Primera División side Aragua.

International career
Ruiz was called up to the Venezuela under-20 side for the 2017 FIFA U-20 World Cup.

Career statistics

Club

Honours

International
Venezuela U-20
FIFA U-20 World Cup: Runner-up 2017
South American Youth Football Championship: Third Place 2017

References

1997 births
Living people
Venezuelan footballers
Association football midfielders
Deportivo La Guaira players
Zulia F.C. players
Venezuelan Primera División players
Footballers from Caracas
21st-century Venezuelan people